

Flamengo Squad changes (2012)

List of all Clube de Regatas do Flamengo transfers in the 2012 season.

In

Out

References

List of Flamengo transfers 2012